The fight-or-flight response is a biological response of humans and other animals to acute stressors.

Fight or Flight may also refer to:

 Fight or Flight (film), a 2007 documentary film
 Fight or Flight, a 1996 book documenting battles from the soldier's perspective by military historian Geoffrey Regan

Music 

 Fight or Flight (EP), a 2000 EP by Turin Brakes
 Fight or Flight (Emily Osment album)
 Fight or Flight (Hoobastank album), 2012
 Fight or Flight?, a 2006 album by Canadian jazz and soul vocalist Kellylee Evans
 Fight or Flight (band), American hard rock band

Television 

 "Fight or Flight" (Star Trek: Enterprise), a 2001 first-season episode of Star Trek: Enterprise
 "Fight or Flight" (Heroes), a 2007 episode of the science fiction television series Heroes
 "Fight or Flight" (Burn Notice), an episode of the USA Network television show Burn Notice
 "Fight or Flight" (QI), an episode of the comedy panel-game series QI
 "Fight or Flight" (Modern Family), an episode of the television series Modern Family
 "Fight or Flight" (Supergirl), an episode of the CBS television series Supergirl
 "Fight or Flight" (The Expanse), first episode of the third season of the Syfy/Amazon Prime Video television series The Expanse
 "Fight or Flight" (Impulse), second episode of the second season of the YouTube Premium television series Impulse